Omiodes iridias is a moth of the family Crambidae. It is endemic to the island of Hawaii.

The larvae feed on Astelia veratroides. They feed on the inner leaves of the crown of the host plant and on areas where the leaves are close together. Young larvae are well hidden by the dense woolly material which covers the leaf surface. They eat one side of the leaf and the mesophyll and leave the opposite epidermis. Full-grown larvae are about 27 mm long, rather slender and pale whitish green.

Pupation takes place in a slight cocoon in the same place where the larvae lived. The pupa is 15 mm long and medium brown.

External links

iridias
Endemic moths of Hawaii
Moths described in 1899